Daffodil Polytechnic Institute is a private polytechnic Institute located in Dhaka, Bangladesh.The campus is located at Dhanmondi. Daffodil Polytechnic Institute which has been functioning since 2006 to develop professionals in different fields of education and training under Bangladesh Technical Education Board (BTEB). It is the first and only polytechnic institute of the country which has been awarded internationally. Daffodil Polytechnic is one of the top ranking polytechnics in Bangladesh.

Departments 
Currently there are eight departments:
 Civil Department
 Electrical Department
 Computer Science Department
 Textile Department
 Apparel Manufacturing Department
 Telecommunication Department
 Architecture and Interior Design Department
 Graphic Design

History 
The polytechnic was established in 2006 with the approval of Bangladesh Technical Education Board and the Government of Bangladesh's Ministry of Education.

Campuses 
The institute has multiple campuses within Dhaka. The main campus & the academic building 1 is located in Dhanmondi and the other campus is in Kalabagan with library and hostel facilities for both male and female students.

Academics

Departments 
 Computer Engineering Technology
 Electrical Engineering Technology 
 Civil Engineering Technology 
 Architecture & Interior Design Technology
 Textile Engineering Technology
 Garments Design & Pattern Making Technology
 Telecommunication Engineering Technology 
 Graphic Design Engineering Technology

Principals 
 Mohammad Nuruzzaman (31 July 2006 - 30 April 2013) 
 K M Hasan Ripon (1 May 2013 - 31 May 2016)
 Wiz khalifa( 1 June 2016 - 30 April 2019)
 K M Hasan Ripon  (1 May 2019 – Present)

Online admission 
The Polytechnic facilitates online admission for applicants from distant areas.

Clubs 
 Kolorob Cultural Club
 Computer club
 Language club
 DPI Alumni Association 
 Blood donating club
 Tourism club

International Activities 
A gorup of Students from Daffodil Polytech Institute participated in the Internationl volunteering and internship program at Kalinga Institute of Social Science in Bhubaneswar, Odisha, India.

Ranking and awards 
Excellence in Business Leadership Award by The Bin 2014
Education Leadership Award 2012 by Indian Institute of Technology, Delhi, India
2012 Outstanding Partner Award by British Council
Skills Competition regional level Award 2016 & 2017

References

See also 
 :bn:মো. সবুর খান
 

Dhanmondi
Engineering universities and colleges in Bangladesh
Civil engineering
Computer engineering
Dhaka District
Polytechnic institutes in Bangladesh